The women's 100 metres hurdles event at the 1997 European Athletics U23 Championships was held in Turku, Finland, on 11 July 1997.

Medalists

Results

Final
11 July
Wind: 1.9 m/s

Heats
11 July
Qualified: first 2 in each heat and 2 best to the Final

Heat 1
Wind: 1.8 m/s

Heat 2
Wind: 1.3 m/s

Heat 3
Wind: 1.0 m/s

Participation
According to an unofficial count, 18 athletes from 15 countries participated in the event.

 (1)
 (1)
 (1)
 (2)
 (1)
 (1)
 (1)
 (1)
 (1)
 (1)
 (2)
 (2)
 (1)
 (1)
 (1)

References

100 metres hurdles
Sprint hurdles at the European Athletics U23 Championships